Lawrence County is the name of eleven counties in the United States.
All but the one in South Dakota were named for the U.S. naval hero of the War of 1812, Captain James Lawrence.

 Lawrence County, Alabama 
 Lawrence County, Arkansas 
 Lawrence County, Illinois 
 Lawrence County, Indiana 
 Lawrence County, Kentucky 
 Lawrence County, Mississippi 
 Lawrence County, Missouri 
 Lawrence County, Ohio 
 Lawrence County, Pennsylvania 
 Lawrence County, South Dakota 
 Lawrence County, Tennessee

See also
St. Lawrence County, New York